The 2018 IIHF Challenge Cup of Asia was the 11th edition of the IIHF Challenge Cup of Asia, an annual international ice hockey tournament held by the International Ice Hockey Federation (IIHF). The Top Division of the tournament will take place from 3 to 8 April 2018 at the SM Mall of Asia Ice Skating Rink in Pasay, Metro Manila, Philippines.

Top Division

Participants

Match officials
3 referees and 7 linesmen were selected for the tournament.

Referees
  Ryan Cairns
  Volker Westhaus
  Vladimir Yefremov

Linesmen
  Helan Salem Al Ameri
  Chi Hongda
  Huang Jen-hung
  Martin Jobbágy
  Edmond Ng
  Edvardas Valickas
  Heru Wardana

Standings

Schedules
All times are in Philippine Standard Time (UTC+8).

Division I

The Division I competition was played from 24 to 29 March 2018 in Kuala Lumpur, Malaysia.

Participants

Final ranking

(H) Host; (P) Promoted.Source: IIHF

References

IIHF Challenge Cup of Asia
IIHF Challenge Cup of Asia
IIHF Challenge Cup of Asia
IIHF Challenge Cups of Asia
IIHF Challenge Cup of Asia